Miss Mizoram is a beauty pageant for single women in the State of Mizoram in India.

After its inception, the pageant was organized by the Mizoram Journalists Association. After reaching its 10th year, Lelte Weekly, a weekly magazine, took over its organization. Since 2014, IHM has served as the main organizer.

The Miss Mizoram for 2020 was Zirsangpuii (Miss Mizoram Khawzawl 2020).

Miss Mizoram 2014 
After nine years of hiatus, the Miss Mizoram 2014 Pageant was held at Aizawl,. Hundreds of women applied for the pageant.  The field was narrowed to 20 and then 16. These 16 women competed in a preliminary swimsuit, talent, and fashion show. An online vote was held to determine the Miss Photogenic and People's Choice Awards.

The winner was H. Lalchhanhimi.  However, she was later dethroned for getting married during her reign.  The 1st Runner Up, C. Vanlalmalsawmi, became Miss Mizoram 2014.

C. Vanlalmalsawmi (1st Runner Up Later Miss Mizoram) represented Mizoram at Sunsilk Mega Miss North-East 2014 Pageant in which she was one of the Top 10 Semi-Finalist.
She was previously Miss Govt. Aizawl College. She later participated at the Miss Luit Pageant where she finished the pageant as the 1st Runner Up. She also participated at the Manappuram Miss Queen of India 2015 pageant in which she is one of the Top 12 Semi-Finalist and also won the Miss India East Award at the said pageant. She later competed at Miss Northeast Diva 2020 (A preliminary pageant for Miss Diva - Miss Universe India) and finished as the 2nd Runner Up.

Results

Contestants 
The final 16 contestants were:

Sub-Title Awards

Miss Mizoram 2017 

The Miss Mizoram 2017 Grand Finale was held on 10 March 2017 at Mizoram University Multipurpose Auditorium. Rody H Vanlalhriatpuii of Lawngtlai representing Lawngtlai District was crowned the new Miss Mizoram 2017.

Vanlalhriatpuii represented Mizoram at Femina Miss India and completed as top 15 finalists.  She  also won Miss Popular and Miss Talented.

Contestants 
 Lalbiakhlui -  Top 10 
 C.Lalrinchhuangi -  Top 10
 K.Lalzirtluangi -  Top 10 
 Lalhlimpuii
 V.Lalnunpuii -  Top 10 
 Sharon Vanlalhruaii -  Top 5 
 Malsawmdawngliani Zote -  Top 10 
 Lalramnghaki
 Lalchhuansangi
 C.Vanhlupuii
 Catherine Lallawmsangi -  Top 5 
 Zothanmawii
 Rody.H.Vanlalhriatpuii -  Miss Mizoram 2017 
 Lalmalsawmi -  2nd Runner Up 
 Esther Vanlalnunpuii Sailo -  1st Runner Up 
 Lalnunpuii

Miss Mizoram 2018 

The Miss Mizoram 2018 Grand Finale was held in Mizoram University Auditorium on 7 March 2018. Thirteen women participated. The winner was  T. Ramthanmawii of North Khawbung.

Results

Contestants 

The final 13 contestants are

Miss Mizoram 2020 
The RFL Plastic Miss Mizoram 2020 Grand Finale was held on 14 March 2020 at R.Dengthuama Indoor Stadium in Mualpui, Aizawl. Hosted by Rini Hlondo and broadcast by Zonet tv.17, 17 women competed;  teb were districts winner and seven from a audition in Aizawl. The winner was Zirsangpuii of Khawzawl, Vengthar (Miss Mizoram 2020 Khawzawl District ).

Results

Sub Title Awards

Contestants

Judges 

 1. Vanlalrema Vantawl - Former MJA President
 2. Rody H.Vanlalhriatpuii  - Miss Mizoram 2017
 3. Lucy Sailo - Professional Designers 
 4. Susan Ralte -

Notes 

Ngurthanpuii Sailo (Miss beautiful skin and Top 10 Semi-Finalist) represented Mizoram at Sunsilk Mega Miss North-East 2013 Pageant in which she placed as the Top 5 Finalist.

Lalhriatpuii (Miss perfect 10 and Top 10 Semi-Finalist) later established herself as a successful air hostess.

Lily Lalremkimi Darnei (Top 5 at Miss Mizoram 2018) was crowned as fbb colours Femina Miss India Mizoram 2018 and won 3 sub Titles at Femina Miss India East Zonal Pageant and Miss Iron Maiden subtitle at the Grand Finale night and she was one of the Top 12 Semi-Finalist at the Grand Finale.

Lalnunthari Rualhleng ( Nunui Rualhleng) a r model from Mizoram was crowned fbb colors Femina Miss India Mizoram 2019. She won 2 subtitles at the Femina Miss India East Zonal Pageant and 2 other subtitles at the Grand Finale night. She was selected as one of the Top 12 Semi-Finalist

References
2.Former Miss Mizoram extends support to Myanmar's fight for democracy - INSIDE NE

Beauty pageants in India